Callum Hunter-Hill (born 27 February 1997 in Melrose, Scotland) is a Scottish rugby union player who plays for Saracens. He typically plays second-row.

Rugby Union career

Amateur career

Whilst in Gullane Primary School, Hunter-Hill first played mini rugby for North Berwick Rugby Club. His rugby talent was spotted while at Stewart's Melville College. He won the Brewin Dolphin Shield with Stewart's Melville.

He later won a place to be coached in New Zealand in the summer of 2015 winning the prestigious John Macphail Scholarship. He spent 15 weeks there. He played for Stirling County, captaining the side, when not involved in Warriors duty.

Professional career

He was named as part of the new Glasgow district Rugby Academy founded by the Scottish Rugby Union in 2015.

He made his debut for Glasgow Warriors coming off the bench in a friendly against the Army Rugby Union side in September 2015. The Warriors won the match 71–0.

Hunter-Hill again turned out for the Warriors in the pre-season match against Harlequins on 20 August 2016.

He made his competitive debut for the Warriors on 8 October 2016 when he replaced Rob McAlpine in the away match against Zebre in the Pro12.

On 16 November 2016 it was announced that Hunter-Hill had joined London Scottish in a short-term loan move.

On 15 May 2017 it was announced that he had secured a professional contract and signed for Edinburgh Rugby.

On 13/9/19 it was announced that he was joining Saracens on academy loan. He has since signed a long term permanent contract to remain at Saracens until 2023.

International career

He played for Scotland for the under-18s and captained the side. He captained Scotland U20s.

References

External links 
Scottish Rugby biography
Glasgow Warriors biography

1997 births
Living people
Glasgow Warriors players
Scottish rugby union players
Stirling County RFC players
London Scottish F.C. players
People educated at North Berwick High School
Edinburgh Rugby players
Rugby union players from Melrose, Scottish Borders
Rugby union locks